Johal is a surname.

Johal may also refer to:
Johal, Jalandhar, a village in Punjab, India
Johal, Phillaur, a village Punjab, India
Johal, Faisalabad, a village in Punjab, Pakistan